Erhard Siedel (1 November 1895 – 16 November 1979) was a German actor. He appeared in more than thirty films from 1919 to 1970.

Selected filmography

References

External links 
 

1895 births
1979 deaths
German male film actors
German male silent film actors
20th-century German male actors
People from Meissen (district)